Rutter may refer to:

 Rutter (name), a surname of English origin
 Rutter (nautical), a mariner's handbook of sailing directions
 Rutter, Ontario, Canada
 Rutter Group, a publisher of materials for lawyers and judges in the U.S.
 Operation Rutter, code name for the Dieppe Raid in 1942
 Rutter's, a convenience store chain

See also
Routier (disambiguation)